WVMC may refer to:

 WVMC-FM, a radio station (90.7 FM) licensed to Mansfield, Ohio, United States
 WVMC (AM), a defunct radio station (1360 AM) formerly licensed to Mount Carmel, Illinois, United States